Gergő Gyönyörű (born 12 March 2001) is a Hungarian football midfielder who plays for Karcagi SE.

Career statistics

References

External links
 
 

2001 births
People from Debrecen
Living people
Hungarian footballers
Association football midfielders
Debreceni VSC players
Debreceni EAC (football) players
Nemzeti Bajnokság I players
Nemzeti Bajnokság II players